Mark Kiely is an American actor, probably best known for his recurring guest appearance as Gil Meyers in Beverly Hills, 90210. He also appeared in Charlie's Angels and The Judge. He currently lives in Rhode Island and is a beloved swim coach to many. He also graduated from Assumption College in Worcester, Mass.

Partial filmography

Television
Beverly Hills, 90210 (1992–1995)
Tears and Laughter: The Joan and Melissa Rivers Story (1994)
Full Circle (1996)
Lois & Clark: The New Adventures of Superman (1996)
NYPD Blue (1996–1997)
JAG (1996, 2003)
A Nightmare Come True (1997)
Brooklyn South (1997–1998)
Primal Force (1999)
City of Angels (2000)
Rain (2000)
The Fugitive (2001)
Crossing Jordan (2002)
The Shield (2002)
American Dreams (2003)
The Guardian (2003)
CSI (2004)
Without a Trace (2004)
CSI: Miami (2006)
CSI: NY (2007)
24 (season 7, 2009)

Movies

The Edge (1997)
Gods and Monsters (1998)
Falcon Down (2000)
Daybreak (2000)
Bruce Almighty (2003)
Johnny Virus (2005)
Islander (2006)
Cheesecake Casserole (2012)
The Judge (2014)

References

External links

 Mark Kiely's official website

American male film actors
American male television actors
Living people
20th-century American male actors
21st-century American male actors
Year of birth missing (living people)
Assumption University (Worcester) alumni